Dichoropetalum is a genus of flowering plants in the carrot family. 

The following species are accepted:

The following hybrid is accepted:
 Dichoropetalum × zirnichii (Cohrs) Reduron

References

Apioideae
Taxa named by Eduard Fenzl
Apioideae genera